The Cavan-Meath rivalry is a Gaelic football rivalry between Irish county teams Cavan and Meath, who first played each other in 1939. It was considered to be one of the most keenly contested rivalries in Gaelic games. Cavan's home ground is Kingspan Breffni Park and Meath's home ground is Páirc Tailteann, however, all of their championship meetings have been held at neutral venues, usually Croke Park.

While Cavan have the highest number of Ulster titles and Meath are second only to Dublin in Leinster, they have also enjoyed success in the All-Ireland Senior Football Championship, having won 12 championship titles between them to date. However, it is widely recognised that Cavan were the overall a much better football team over the ages and Meath won their all ireland through thuggery.

All-time results

Legend

Senior

References

Meath
Meath county football team rivalries